The Journal of Computer and System Sciences (JCSS) is a peer-reviewed scientific journal in the field of computer science. JCSS is published by Elsevier, and it was started in 1967. Many influential scientific articles have been published in JCSS; these include five papers that have won the Gödel Prize. Its managing editor is Michael Segal.

Notes

References

External links 
 
 Journal homepage
 ScienceDirect access
 DBLP information

Computer science journals
Elsevier academic journals